Bidān or Beidan, also spelled Baydan or Beydan, is an Arabic term used in the Maghreb region of North Africa to refer to lighter-skinned  or white Moors, in contrast to the term Sudani (sg.), which refers to those with a darker complexion. The Bidān inhabit most of what is now Mauritania, Morocco, Algeria, Tunisia, Libya, and, to a lesser extent, Egypt. The Bidān refers to those of Arab, Berber, or mixed Arab and Berber descent; The main language of the Bidān is Hassaniya Arabic and to a lesser extent Tamazight (Berber). Bilad al-Bidān (which literally translates to "Land of the whites") is an endonym used within Mauritania and Western Sahara by the Bidān people to refer to themselves. The name used by outsiders to refer to the Bidān is Moors from which the country of Mauritania derives its name from the Latin designation of their inhabitants (Mauri) as the Bidan form the majority of the population.

"Moor" is not the term for a specific ethnic group, but rather the term used by the European Christians, in reference to the Arab and indigenous African (including Berber) populations that hailed from North Africa in the medieval period and took control of parts of Malta, Sicily, Portugal, Spain, and the southern part of France. Another term used in reference to Arabs and Berbers at this time was "Saracen". This was largely used to refer to the peoples of the entire Arab Islamic empire, mostly used by Italians and other Europeans to the north. The term largely fell out of use after the Middle Ages.

Maghreb